High Performance Fortran (HPF) is an extension of Fortran 90 with constructs that support parallel computing, published by the High Performance Fortran Forum (HPFF).  The HPFF was convened and chaired by Ken Kennedy of Rice University.  The first version of the HPF Report was published in 1993.

Building on the array syntax introduced in Fortran 90, HPF uses a data parallel model of computation to support spreading the work of a single array computation over multiple processors.  This allows efficient implementation on both SIMD and MIMD style architectures.  HPF features included:

 New Fortran statements, such as FORALL, and the ability to create PURE (side effect free) procedures
 Compiler directives for recommended alignment and distribution of array data (influenced by the earlier Fortran D research effort)
 Compiler directive for specifying processor arrangements (e.g., rank, extent, etc)
 Compiler directive for asserting loop iteration independence
 Extrinsic procedure interface for interfacing to non-HPF parallel procedures such as those using message passing
 Additional library routines - including environmental inquiry, parallel prefix/suffix (e.g., 'scan', segmented scan), data scattering, and sorting operations

Fortran 95 incorporated several HPF capabilities.  In response, the HPFF again convened and published the HPF 2.0 Report.  The updated report removed material which was already covered by Fortran 95.  The report was also reorganized and revised based on experience with HPF 1.0.

While some vendors did incorporate HPF into their compilers in the 1990s, some aspects proved difficult to implement and of questionable use.  Since then, most vendors and users have moved to OpenMP-based parallel processing.  However HPF continues to have influence.  For example, the proposed BIT data type for the upcoming Fortran-2008 standard contains a number of new intrinsic functions taken directly from HPF.

See also
 Partitioned global address space

External links
 HPFF - Rice University HPF Forum
 http://wotug.org/parallel/standards/hpf
 ADAPTOR- An open-source HPF compilation system 
 HPF+ - HPF for advanced applications
 The rise and fall of High Performance Fortran: an historical object lesson

References

Concurrent programming languages
Fortran programming language family